The Widow Casey's Return is a 1912 American silent black and white comedy film produced by Lubin Manufacturing Company.

It's a lost film on one reel. The film was produced by the Philadelphia-based Lubin Manufacturing Company and was lost in an explosion and fire at the Lubin vaults in 1914.

Cast
 Jerold T. Hevener as The Preferred Suitor
 Eleanor Caines as The Widow Casey
 Jack Barrymore as The Rejected Suitor
 Will Chamberlin as The Hobo

See also
John Barrymore filmography

References

External links
 

American silent short films
American black-and-white films
Silent American comedy films
1912 comedy films
1912 films
Lost American films
Lubin Manufacturing Company films
General Film Company
1912 lost films
Lost comedy films
1910s American films